Azam Basti is a neighborhood in Karachi East district of Karachi, Pakistan. It was previously administered as part of Jamshed Town, which was disbanded in 2011.

There are several ethnic groups in Azam Basti including Muhajirs, Punjabis, Sindhis, Kashmiris, Seraikis, Pakhtuns, Balochis, Memons, Bohras,  Ismailis. Over 90% of the population in Azam Basti is Christian. The population of Jamshed Town is estimated to be nearly one million.

Azam Basti contains a vibrant Christian population represented by the Catholic parish of St Paul.

References

External links 
 Karachi website - Archived

Neighbourhoods of Karachi
Jamshed Town